The following is a partial list of the "V" codes for Medical Subject Headings (MeSH), as defined by the United States National Library of Medicine (NLM).

This list continues the information at List of MeSH codes (V02). Codes following these are found at List of MeSH codes (V04). For other MeSH codes, see List of MeSH codes.

The source for this content is the set of 2006 MeSH Trees from the NLM.

– study characteristics (publication type)

– case reports (publication type)

– clinical conference (publication type)

– clinical trial (publication type)
  – clinical trial, phase I (publication type)
  – clinical trial, phase II (publication type)
  – clinical trial, phase III (publication type)
  – clinical trial, phase IV (publication type)
  – controlled clinical trial (publication type)
  – multicenter study (publication type)
  – randomized controlled trial (publication type)

– comparative study

– consensus development conference (publication type)
  – consensus development conference, NIH (publication type)

– evaluation studies (publication type)

– in vitro

– meta-analysis (publication type)

– multicenter study (publication type)

– scientific integrity review (publication type)

– twin study (publication type)

– validation studies (publication type)

The list continues at List of MeSH codes (V04).

V03